Supra Obakeng Ramoeletsi Mahumapelo is a South African politician and musician. He served as the Provincial Secretary of the African National Congress North West Provincial Leadership from 2011 until August 2018. He previously served as Speaker of the North West Provincial Legislature and member of the North West Provincial Legislature and Premier of North West. Mahumapelo stepped down in May 2018 after violent protests called for him to step down.

On 9 May 2018, Mahumapelo announced that he would take leave of absence and appointed Finance MEC Wendy Nelson as acting Premier. President Cyril Ramaphosa appointed an inter-ministerial task team to investigate violent protests in the province's capital Mahikeng and other towns through the province over a long period of time. which revealed a range of weaknesses across the provincial government and in municipalities. These included poor governance practices‚ skills shortages‚ incompetence‚ corruption and questionable supply chain management practices. Mahumapelo resigned as premier on 23 May 2018 and 
as member of the North West Provincial Legislature on 22 June 2018.
He was subsequently appointed to head the ANC's provincial political school.

Early life and education
Supra Mahumapelo was born on 7 June 1968 in Manamolelo outside Delareyville in the Western Transvaal. His mother, Agnes Matlakala Bereng, was a domestic worker who worked in Klerksdorp and later in Helderkruin, Roodepoort. She was forced by her son to leave her domestic work in 1995. His father, Stephen Kalagongwe Mahumapelo, was an entrepreneur in Saulspoort near Rustenburg. Mahumapelo was the herd boy of his village.

He started his schooling at Marotse Primary School and later attended Tlotlego Middle School in the Atamelang township. He spent his high school years in Phatshima High School in Atamelang and matriculated at Kgamanyane High School in Moruleng.

After matric, Mahumapelo went to the former Transvaal Northern Technikon and obtained a National Diploma in Commercial Practice (NDCom). At the University of South Africa, he then did a Certificate in Public Finance and Economics. He then obtained his masters degree in Political Economy at the University of Port Elizabeth.

References

External links 

 

Living people
1968 births
African National Congress politicians
Premiers of North West (South African province)
Members of the National Assembly of South Africa
21st-century South African politicians